Nicolay (born Matthijs Rook in 1974) is an electronica, R&B and hip hop record producer from the Netherlands, better known as one half of The Foreign Exchange. Due to his work, Nicolay now resides in the United States.

In December 2009, The Foreign Exchange were nominated for a Grammy, for Best Urban/Alternative Performance for the track "Daykeeper," from their second album, Leave It All Behind. Nicolay is the fourth Dutch person to be nominated.

Discography
The Foreign Exchange
Connected (2004, BBE)
Leave It All Behind (2008, Foreign Exchange Music)
Authenticity (2010, Foreign Exchange Music)
Love in Flying Colors (2013, Foreign Exchange Music)
Tales from the Land of Milk and Honey (2015, Foreign Exchange Music)
Nicolay & Kay
TIME:LINE (EU Release: February 1, 2008 & US February 12, 2008, NMR)
Nicolay & The Hot At Nights
Glaciers (2018, Foreign Exchange Music)
Solo
City Lights Vol. 1 (2005, BBE)
Dutch Masters Mixtape V. 1 (2005, HardBoiled)
City Lights Vol. 1.5 (2005, BBE)
Here (2006, BBE)
City Lights Vol. 2: Shibuya (2009, The Foreign Exchange Music)
City Lights Vol. 3: Soweto (2015, The Foreign Exchange Music)
Remix for Roy Ayers: "Funk in the Hole (Nicolay Mix)" (Roy Ayers Virgin Ubiquity Remixed) (2004), (BBE)

Singles
"I Am the Man" (2006, BBE)
"I Love the Way You Love" (2006, BBE)
"Lose Your Way" (2009,  The Foreign Exchange Music)

See also
 Dutch hip hop

References

External links
The Foreign Exchange Official website

Dutch hip hop musicians
Hip hop record producers
Living people
Tracker musicians
People from Zwijndrecht, Netherlands
Musicians from Utrecht (city)
1973 births